Reza Olfati-Saber is an Iranian roboticist and Assistant Professor of Engineering at the Thayer School of Engineering at Dartmouth College. Olfati-Saber is an internationally renowned expert in the control and coordination of multi-robot formations. He has also worked in mobile sensor networks, and innovative educational and outreach activities in robotics for disaster management and rescue operations.

Early life and education
Olfati-Saber was born in Iran. He received his B.S. degree in 1994 in Electrical Engineering from Sharif University of Technology. He received S.M. degree in 1997 and Ph.D. degree in 2001 in both Electrical Engineering and Computer Science from Massachusetts Institute of Technology (MIT).

He was a postdoctoral scholar at the California Institute of Technology (Caltech) from 2001 until 2004.

Awards and honors 

 2010 – Presidential Early Career Award for Scientists and Engineers (PECASE), National Science Foundation (NSF)

References

External links
 Dartmouth faculty website

Year of birth missing (living people)
Living people
Control theorists
Dartmouth College faculty
Iranian roboticists